Shahidabad (also Romanized as Shahīdābād) is a village in Zarrineh Rud Rural District, Bizineh Rud District, Khodabandeh County, Zanjan Province, Iran. At the 2006 census, its population was 735, in 142 families.

References 

Populated places in Khodabandeh County